The Limburgs Symfonie Orkest (English: Limburg Symphony Orchestra) was a Dutch orchestra based in Maastricht, Netherlands. The orchestra was resident at the Theater aan het Vrijthof in Maastricht since 1992, and also performed in opera productions with Opera Zuid. The orchestra had received funding from the Dutch Ministry of Education, Culture and Science, the Province of Limburg and the Municipality of Maastricht.

The ensemble gave its first concert on 2 September 1883 as the Maastrichts Stedelijk Orkest ("Maastricht Municipal Orchestra"), with Otto Wolf as its first conductor. The orchestra also gave concerts in the North Brabant region. In 1955, the orchestra acquired the name of the Limburgs Symfonie Orkest. Ed Spanjaard served twice as chief conductor, first from 1982 to 1988, and later as the orchestra's final chief conductor, from 2001 to 2012.

Following elimination of government grants, the Limburg Symphony Orchestra merged April 2013 with Het Brabants Orkest to form the South Netherlands Philharmonic.

Chief conductors
 Otto Wolf (1883–1915)
 Henri Hermans (1915–1947)
 Paul Hupperts (1947–1949)
 André Rieu sr. (1949–1980)
 Ed Spanjaard (1982–1988)
 Salvador Mas Conde (1988–1994)
 Shlomo Mintz (1995–1998)
 Junichi Hirokami (1998–2000)
 Ed Spanjaard (2001–2012)

References

External links
 
 Dutch-language history of the orchestra

1883 establishments in the Netherlands
2013 disestablishments in the Netherlands
Dutch orchestras
Symphony orchestras
Disbanded orchestras
Musical groups established in 1883
Musical groups disestablished in 2013
Musical groups from Limburg (Netherlands)
Culture in Maastricht
History of Maastricht